Baron Cochrane of Cults, of Crawford Priory in the County of Fife, is a title in the Peerage of the United Kingdom. It was created in 1919 for the Liberal Unionist politician and former Under-Secretary of State for the Home Department, the Hon. Thomas Cochrane. He was the second and youngest son of Thomas Barnes Cochrane, 11th Earl of Dundonald.  the title is held by the first Baron's great-grandson, the fifth Baron, who succeeded his father in that year.

Two other members of this branch of the Cochrane family have also gained distinction. Captain the Hon. Sir Archibald Douglas Cochrane, second son of the first Baron, was a naval commander and politician. Air Chief Marshal the Hon. Sir Ralph Cochrane, youngest son of the first Baron, was a notable Royal Air Force commander. Commodore the Honourable Michael Cochrane OBE Royal Navy, younger son of the fourth Baron, has continued the family tradition of Royal Navy service.

The family seat is Cults House, near Cupar, Fife. The former was Crawford Priory, also in Fife.

Barons Cochrane of Cults (1919)
Thomas Horatio Arthur Ernest Cochrane, 1st Baron Cochrane of Cults (1857–1951)
Thomas George Frederick Cochrane, 2nd Baron Cochrane of Cults (1883–1968)
Thomas Charles Anthony Cochrane, 3rd Baron Cochrane of Cults (1922–1990)
Ralph Henry Vere Cochrane, 4th Baron Cochrane of Cults (1926–2017)
Thomas Hunter Vere Cochrane, 5th Baron Cochrane of Cults (b. 1957)

The heir presumptive is the present holder's brother, the Hon. Michael Charles Nicholas Cochrane (b. 1959).

Arms

See also
Earl of Dundonald
Baron Lamington

Notes

References

Kidd, Charles, Williamson, David (editors). Debrett's Peerage and Baronetage (1990 edition). New York: St Martin's Press, 1990, 

Baronies in the Peerage of the United Kingdom
1919 establishments in the United Kingdom
Cochrane family
Noble titles created in 1919
Noble titles created for UK MPs